Roger Duffy (26 September 1931 – 9 July 2003) was an Australian rules footballer who played with Footscray in the Victorian Football League (VFL) during the 1950s.

Duffy was originally from Newtown and as a fullforward topped the club's goalkicking with 78 goals in 1950 and 96 the next year. He was then recruited to Footscray and made his debut in 1952, his tally of 20 goals more than any of his teammate for the year.

He was one of the better players in the 1954 Grand Final with 16 kicks from the half forward flank.

References

External links

 

1931 births
2003 deaths
Western Bulldogs players
Western Bulldogs Premiership players
Newtown Australian Football Club players
Australian rules footballers from New South Wales
One-time VFL/AFL Premiership players